Małgorzata Zajączkowska, aka Margaret Sophie Stein (born January 31, 1956 in Warsaw), is a Polish actress and writer. Beginning in 1979, she acted on stage in the Teatr Narodowy. In 1981, Zajączkowska moved to the United States and, adopting the stage name Margaret Sophie Stein, continued her acting career in television and film. In 1999, Zajączkowska returned to Poland and continued acting there in films and television. She has also lectured at the Warsaw Film School.

Filmography 
 Outside of Poland
 Late Bloomers (2023) as Antonina
 Ninas resa (2005) as Fru Pelikan
 Simply Irresistible (1999) as Mrs. Mueller
 A Will of Their Own (1998) as Mrs. Krakowski
 All My Children (1994–1995) as Corvina Lang
 Bullets over Broadway (1994) as Lili
 Seasons of the Heart (1994)
 Skylark (1993) as Maggie
 Sarah, Plain and Tall (1991) as Maggie Grant
 Enemies: A Love Story (1989) as Yadwiga
 Balles perdues (1983) as Lucienne
 Danton (1983) as Servante Duplay
  (1981)

 Polish
 Blindness (2016)
 Walesa. Man of Hope (2013) as Shop assistant
 Teraz albo nigdy! (2008) as Anna Bosz
 Ekipa (2007) as Foreign minister
 Magda M. (2005–2006) as Halina Czerska
 Złotopolscy (2004–2009) as Magdalena Ordyńska-Złotopolska
 Wszyscy jesteśmy Chrystusami (2006) as Nurse
 Pensjonat pod Różą (2004) as Teresa Białkowska
 Lokatorzy (2004) as Zofia
 Tak czy nie? (2003) as Anna
 Pogoda na jutro (2003) as Renata Kozioł
 Na dobre i na złe (2002–2003, 2009) as Irena Kozioł
 Psie serce (2002) as Misia
 Więzy krwi (2001) as Danuta
 Żółty szalik (2000)
 Sukces (2000) as Wanda Szarecka
 Miasteczko (2000) as Psychologist
 Epitafium dla Barbary Radziwillówny (1983) as Bogna
 Dziecinne pytania (1981) as Girl
 Bo oszalalem dla niej (1980) as Alina
 Constans (1980) as Grażyna
 Bez miłości (1980) as Marianna Skoczek
 Zdjecia próbne (1977) as Girl at screen tests (uncredited)

Theatre

References

External links

1956 births
Living people
Polish film actresses
Polish stage actresses
Polish television actresses
Actresses from Warsaw
20th-century Polish actresses
21st-century Polish actresses